Carolien is a Dutch and Swedish feminine given name. It is a feminine form of Carolus, and a diminutive form of Carolina and Caroline.

Given names
Carolien Salomons (born 1974), Dutch cricketer
Carolien van Kilsdonk (born 1963), Dutch snowboarder

See also

Caroline (name)

Notes

Dutch feminine given names
Swedish feminine given names